Coffee with Lahiru and Muditha is a  Sri Lankan talk-show aired on Swarnavahini, hosted by Lahiru Mudalige and Muditha Wijesundara. The program is modeled after the Indian talk-show Koffee with Karan.

Overview 
At present, the show airs on Sundays at 10.00 a.m. on Swarnavahini. Its first episode was aired on May 11, 2008 with popular musician Iraj Weeraratne and actress Anarkalli Aakarsha being the guests. It is hosted by two regular presenters on Swarnavahini, Lahiru Mudalige of Hada Raendi Paeya fame and Muditha Wijesundara, who had previously hosted Dutu Nodutu.

The show is the first of its type in Sri Lanka and therefore brings a novel experience to the viewers. Every week, two celebrities, mostly from the same field are invited to a spend a relaxing but entertaining ninety minutes, sharing their opinions and experiences with each other. The program is primarily divided into three segments. In the first segment, named "Like What," ten questions related to a number of topics are directed at each celebrity, and the answers given by each are often compared with one another. In the second, "Hard Talk," the hosts pose a number of tough questions to the celebrities, mostly related to their own experience in the field, and give them the opportunity to respond to criticisms. In the final segment, "Match It," coffee together with refreshments are served at the celebrities. While they enjoy the coffee, the show presents a number of pre-recorded clips of what each celebrity thinks of his/her colleague. In this, they answer questions such as the date they first met each other, their views on each other's talents, etc.

To-date, the show has invited celebrities from a variety of different fields ranging from music, TV, cinema to sports and politics.

External links
 Official Site
 New On-Demand Video Website

Sri Lankan television talk shows
2009 Sri Lankan television series debuts
2000s Sri Lankan television series
2010s Sri Lankan television series
Swarnavahini original programming